Thomas Kärrbrandt (born March 18, 1959) is a retired Swedish professional ice hockey player. He played for Västra Frölunda IF in Elitserien.

Career statistics

External links

1959 births
Frölunda HC players
Living people
Swedish ice hockey defencemen
Place of birth missing (living people)